The 2015–16 Women's Big Bash League season or WBBL|01 was the first season of the Women's Big Bash League (WBBL), the semi-professional women's Twenty20 domestic cricket competition in Australia. The tournament ran from 5 December 2015 to 24 January 2016.

In the final at the Melbourne Cricket Ground, the Sydney Thunder defeated cross-town rivals, the Sydney Sixers, to win the inaugural championship title. Thunder all-rounder Erin Osborne managed bowling figures of 3/21 in the decider and was named Player of the Final.

Melbourne Stars captain Meg Lanning was the leading run-scorer of WBBL|01 and was consequently named Player of the Tournament, although her team narrowly missed out on qualifying for finals. Sydney Thunder medium-pace bowler Rene Farrell was the tournament's leading wicket-taker.

Teams 
Teams were aligned with franchises in the men's Big Bash League and each squad consisted of 14 players, with an allowance of up to five marquee signings including a maximum of three from overseas. Australian marquees were defined as players who made at least ten limited-overs appearances for the national team between 1 July 2012 and 1 July 2015.

Points table

Win–loss table 
Below is a summary of results for each team's fourteen regular season matches, plus finals where applicable, in chronological order. A team's opponent for any given match is listed above the margin of victory/defeat.

Fixtures
The format of the group stage was a double round-robin tournament. Several matches were scheduled at neutral venues with as many as five teams playing multiple matches in one city on the same weekend. There were 8 double-header regular season fixtures with the men's Big Bash League, as well as the semi-finals and final.

Weekend 1

Weekend 2

Weekend 3

Weekend 4

Weekend 5

Weekend 6

Weekend 7

Knockout phase

Semi-finals

Final

Statistics

Highest totals

Most runs

Most wickets

Awards

Player of the tournament
Player of the Tournament votes are awarded on a 3-2-1 basis by the two standing umpires at the conclusion of every match, meaning a player can receive a maximum of six votes per game.

Team of the tournament
An honorary XI recognising the standout performers of WBBL|01 was named by bigbash.com.au:
 Meg Lanning (Melbourne Stars)
 Beth Mooney (Brisbane Heat) – wicket-keeper
 Charlotte Edwards (Perth Scorchers)
 Ellyse Perry (Sydney Sixers)
 Heather Knight (Hobart Hurricanes) – captain
 Alex Blackwell (Sydney Thunder)
 Sara McGlashan (Sydney Sixers)
 Morna Nielsen (Melbourne Stars)
 Marizanne Kapp (Sydney Sixers)
 Veronica Pyke (Hobart Hurricanes)
 Rene Farrell (Sydney Thunder)

Young gun award 
Players under 21 years of age at the start of the season are eligible for the Young Gun Award. Weekly winners are selected over the course of the season by a panel of Cricket Australia officials based on match performance, on-field and off-field attitude, and their demonstration of skill, tenacity and good sportsmanship. Each weekly winner receives a $500 Rebel gift card and the overall winner receives a $5000 cash prize, as well as access to a learning and mentor program.

The WBBL|01 Young Gun title was awarded to Sydney Thunder fast bowler Lauren Cheatle, who claimed 18 wickets at an economy rate of 5.81 across the season.

"Player of the match" tally

Audience
A total of ten matches were televised on free-to-air in the first season of Women's Big Bash League (WBBL) on One HD and Channel Ten. The average TV ratings for these matches are given below.

Initially only eight matches (seven regular season double-headers and the grand final) were scheduled to be televised on One HD. Due to higher than expected viewership, Channel Ten decided to move the Melbourne Derby on 2 January, the Sydney Smash on 16 January and the grand final to the primary channel, and also added coverage of the two semi finals on One.

References

Further reading

Notes

External links
Official fixtures

 
Women's Big Bash League seasons
!
Women's Big Bash League